The Battle of Los Angeles is the third studio album by American rock band Rage Against the Machine, released by Epic Records on November 2, 1999. At the 43rd Annual Grammy Awards, it was nominated for Best Rock Album, and the song "Guerrilla Radio" won the award for Best Hard Rock Performance. In their year-end lists, Time and Rolling Stone magazines both named the album the best of 1999.

The album has been certified double platinum by the Recording Industry Association of America, indicating sales of at least two million units. It would be the last full-length studio album of original material released by the band before their first breakup in 2000 (their next album consisted of entirely of covers and was released after the breakup).

Concept
"Voice of the Voiceless", a song referring to American political activist and journalist Mumia Abu-Jamal, references a letter written by Mao Zedong, called "A Single Spark Can Start a Prairie Fire". Another Rage–Mumia–Mao connection can be seen in Mumia's paraphrased words from Mao's "power grows out of the barrel of a gun" when Mumia gave testimony in his trial for the murder of a Philadelphia police officer in an altercation after a traffic stop: "It is America who has seized political power from the Indian [Native American] race, not by God, not by Christianity, not by goodness, but by the barrel of a gun."

The album's cover art was an original piece by Joey Krebs (also known as Joel Jaramillo or "The Street Phantom"), a well-known Los Angeles graffiti artist who has exhibited at numerous galleries in Los Angeles, New York City, and throughout the United States.

Release and promotion
The Battle of Los Angeles debuted at number 1 on the Billboard 200, selling 420,000 copies its first week and keeping Mariah Carey's highly-anticipated new album Rainbow from reaching the top of the chart. It was nominated for Best Rock Album at the 43rd Annual Grammy Awards.

The music videos made for "Sleep Now in the Fire" and "Testify" were directed by documentarian Michael Moore, who appears in both videos.

Critical reception

In their year-end lists, Time and Rolling Stone magazines both named The Battle of Los Angeles the best album of 1999. Retrospectively, it was ranked number 426 on Rolling Stones 2003 list of the 500 greatest albums of all time. In 2005, the album was listed at number 53 in Spin magazine's list of the 100 greatest albums from 1985–2005, as well as number 369 in Rock Hard magazine's book The 500 Greatest Rock & Metal Albums of All Time. In 2021, Metal Hammer magazine named it one of the 20 best metal albums of 1999.

Awards
1999: #1 Time Magazine Critic Pick (The Best Music of 1999)
1999: #1 Rolling Stone Critic Pick (Best Album of 1999)
2001: "Guerrilla Radio" – Grammy Award for Best Hard Rock Performance

Track listing

Bonus promo CD/tape
In the US, some retail stores gave a free promo CD to those who pre-ordered the album that contained the songs "Clear the Lane" (from the "Killing in the Name" single) and "Hadda Be Playing on the Jukebox" (Live) (from the "Bulls on Parade" single). In Australia, certain chains gave a promo tape titled New... Live... Rare to those who pre-ordered the album that featured "Calm Like a Bomb" and the aforementioned two songs repeated on both sides. The versions of all three songs were the same as those that had been previously released.

 Personnel Rage Against the Machine Zack de la Rocha – vocals
 Tom Morello – guitars
 Tim Commerford (credited as "Y. tim K.") – bass
 Brad Wilk – drumsProduction Brendan O'Brien – producer, mixing
 Rage Against the Machine – co-production
 Nick DiDia – engineer, recording
 Russ Fowler – additional engineering
 Sugar D (David Russo)  – additional engineering
 German Villacorta – assistant engineering (at A&M Studios)
 Roger Sommers – assistant engineering (at Royaltone Studios)
 Kevin Lively – assistant engineering (at Silent Sound Studios)
 Ryan Williams – engineering (at Southern Tracks)
 Karl Egsieker – assistant engineering (at Southern Tracks)
 Monique Mitzrahl – assistant engineering (at Sunset Sound)
 Kevin Dean – assistant engineering (at Sunset Sound)
 Michael Parnin – assistant engineering (at Westlake Audio)
 "Atom" – assistant engineering (at Westlake Audio)
 Stephen Marcussen – mastering
 Andrew Garver – digital editing
 Cheryl Mondello – production coordination
 Erin Haley – production coordinationArtwork and design Rage Against the Machine – art direction
 Aimee Macauley – art direction
 Joey Krebs – artwork
 Danny Clinch – photography
 Matt DeMello (as "eye cue") – photography
 Steven Tirona – additional photographyStudios'''
 A&M Studios, Los Angeles, CA – recording, mixing
 Royaltone Studios, Los Angeles, CA – recording, mixing
 Silent Sound Studios, Atlanta, GA – recording, mixing
 Southern Tracks, Atlanta, GA – recording, mixing
 Sunset Sound, Los Angeles, CA – recording, mixing
 Westlake Audio, Los Angeles, CA – recording, mixing
 A&M Mastering Studios, Los Angeles, CA – mastering

 Charts 

 Weekly charts 

 Year-end charts 

 Certifications 

Appearances in other media
"Guerrilla Radio" is featured in Tony Hawk's Pro Skater 2 (2000). The song as it appears in the Nintendo 64 version of the game is heavily-edited, as it is in Madden NFL 10 (2009). Both "Testify" and "Guerrilla Radio" are featured in the 2008 video game Rock Band 2, being on-disc and downloadable, respectively.

"Calm Like a Bomb" appears in the end credits of The Matrix Reloaded (2003).

Saul Williams sampled "Born of a Broken Man" for the song "Om Nia Merican" on his 2001 album Amethyst Rock Star''.

References

External links
 

1999 albums
Albums produced by Brendan O'Brien (record producer)
Epic Records albums
Rage Against the Machine albums